MCTU may refer to:

 Malawi Congress of Trade Unions
 Ministry of Training, Colleges and Universities, part of the Ministry of Education (Ontario)
 Marine Corps Test Unit #1